Zelus tetracanthus, the four-spurred assassin bug, is a species of assassin bug in the family Reduviidae. It is found in the Caribbean Sea, Central America, North America, and South America. Adults are brown, black, or gray and have a body length of 10-16 mm. Their antennae and legs are long and slender. They have a row of four spurs across their thorax. Both adults and nymphs use a sticky secretion to capture prey.

References

Further reading

 
 

Reduviidae
Articles created by Qbugbot
Insects described in 1862